The following outline is provided as an overview of and topical guide to Ladakh:

Ladakh – is a region administered by India as a union territory. Until 2019, it was under the jurisdiction of Jammu and Kashmir. Its location is covered by the Himalayan and Karakoram mountains.

General reference

Names 
 Common English name: Ladakh
 Official English name(s): Union territory of Ladakh
 Adjectivals
 Ladakhi
 Demonyms
 Ladakhis

Geography of Ladakh 

Geography of Ladakh
 Ladakh is: a region administered by India as a union territory
 Atlas of Ladakh

Location of Ladakh 
 Ladakh is situated in the north of India
 Time zone:  Indian Standard Time (UTC+05:30)

Districts of Ladakh 

 Kargil
 Leh

Administration and politics of Ladakh 

 Politics of Ladakh
Form of government: Autonomous administration under India
 Head of state: Lieutenant Governor of Ladakh
 Capital of Ladakh:
 Kargil
 Leh
 Ladakh Police
 Jammu and Kashmir High Court

Autonomous administration in Ladakh 
 Ladakh Autonomous Hill Development Council, Kargil
 Ladakh Autonomous Hill Development Council, Leh

History and culture of Ladakh 

 History of Ladakh
 Maryul
 Namgyal dynasty of Ladakh
 Tibet–Ladakh–Mughal War
 Treaty of Tingmosgang
 Dogra–Tibetan War
 Indo-Pakistani War of 1947–1948
 Military operations in Ladakh (1948)
 Battle of Turtuk
 2010 Ladakh floods
 Culture of Kashmir
 Music of Jammu and Kashmir and Ladakh

Religion in Ladakh 

 Islam in Kashmir
 Buddhism in Kashmir

Economy and infrastructure of Ladakh 

 Tourism in Ladakh

Education in Ladakh 

Central Institute of Buddhist Studies
University of Ladakh

See also

References

External links 

Ladakh